Dean is a ghost town in Lander County, in the U.S. state of Nevada.

History
A post office was established at Dean in 1894, and remained in operation until 1905. The area was named after one Mr. Dean, a local rancher.

References

Ghost towns in Lander County, Nevada